Death-associated protein 6 also known as Daxx is a protein that in humans is encoded by the DAXX gene.

Function 

Daxx, a Death domain-associated protein, was first discovered through its cytoplasmic interaction with the classical death receptor Fas. It has been associated with heterochromatin and PML-NBs (Promyelocytic Leukaemia nuclear bodies) and has been implicated in many nuclear processes including transcription and cell cycle regulation.

This gene encodes a multifunctional protein that resides in multiple locations in the nucleus and in the cytoplasm. Daxx serves as an H3.3 specific histone chaperone, interacting with an H3.3/H4 dimer. It interacts with a wide variety of proteins, such as apoptosis antigen Fas, centromere protein C, and transcription factor erythroblastosis virus E26 oncogene homolog 1 (ETS1). In the nucleus, the encoded protein functions as a potent transcription repressor that binds to sumoylated transcription factors. Its repression can be relieved by the sequestration of this protein into promyelocytic leukemia nuclear bodies or nucleoli. This protein also associates with centromeres in G2 phase. In the cytoplasm, the encoded protein may function to regulate apoptosis. The subcellular localization and function of this protein are modulated by post-translational modifications, including sumoylation, phosphorylation and polyubiquitination.

Structure and localization 

Daxx is uniformly expressed throughout the body, except in the testes and thymus, which have especially high expression of the protein. At the level of the cell, Daxx is found in the cytoplasm, interacting with Fas-receptor or other cytoplasmic molecules, as well as in the nucleus, where it is interacting with some subnuclear structures.  Several additional interacting proteins are known, but not always is there an understanding of the specific function and relevance of this interaction.

Nuclear 

When the PML-NB are absent or disrupted, Daxx is delocalized and apoptosis does not occur. This interaction was demonstrated when PML-NB disrupted cells were treated and Daxx relocalized with the PML-NB.
ATRX, a centromeric heterochromatin component co-localizes with Daxx. This partnership is found mainly in the S-phase of the cell cycle. No expression of Daxx leads to malfunction of S phase and cells with two nuclei are formed. Another centromeric component, CENP-C, associates with Daxx during interphase. While at first Daxx was said to be a "death protein", it is suggested that associating with centromeric components leads to another function of Daxx.

Cytoplasmic and membrane 
Fas-receptor stimulation causes Daxx to translocate out of the nucleus and into the cytoplasm.  The breakdown of glucose produces reactive oxygen species (ROS). These induce extracellular Daxx to translocalize into the cytoplasm following an association with ASK1 (Apoptosis signal-regulating kinase1). Another mechanism for exogenous Daxx import involves CRM1. This transport mechanism is phosphorylation dependent.
Nevertheless, it is not known whether the Fas-receptor stimuli or the ASK1 overexpression are caused by ROS or CRM1 mediated export.

Role in apoptosis

Fas-induced 

After Fas stimulation, Daxx is activated and plays its role of pro-apoptotic protein in activating the c-JUN-N-Terminal Kinase (JNK) pathway.  This pathway normally regulates stress-induced cell death.  It is also essential for development of nerval system by programmed cell death. The real apoptotic process starts after activating this pathway. Daxx does not activate JNK itself but rather the upstream JNK kinase kinase ASK1. Some kind of positive feedback system was also discovered; JNK activates HIPK2, which stands for the translocation of nuclear Daxx to the cytoplasm.  In turn, Daxx activates ASK1.

TGF-β regulated 

TGF-β regulates a variety of different cellular developmental processes including growth, differentiation, proliferation, and cell death. Daxx interacts with the TGF-β type II receptor by binding of C-terminal domain of the protein. When the cell is treated with TGF-β, HIPK2, a nuclear kinase, phosphorylates Daxx and the activated Daxx in turn activates the JNK pathway (see "The Daxx Pathway" figure).

Miscellaneous mechanisms 

Glucose breakdown produces ROS, which leads to Daxx production and relocalization, activating JNK pathway in turn. Another inducer of Daxx production is the exposure to UV-radiation.
ASK1 will be transported to the nucleus when UV-irradiation is used to treat the cell. It is still unknown as to whether ASK1 binds Daxx, due to UV-irradiation.
Another important cell death-property of Daxx is the association with PML-NB. It was shown that Daxx associates with Pml only when exposed to high oxidative stress or UV-irradiation. Another study showed loss of Daxx pro-apoptotic function in case of a mutant without Pml.

Anti-apoptotic function 

A rather surprising property of Daxx is its anti-apoptotic function. When Daxx was not expressed or disrupted during embryonic development, it resulted in an early stage lethality. Other studies showed that lack of Daxx gene caused a higher apoptotic rate in embryonic stem cells.
Only when Daxx was bound to Pml were apoptosis rates higher, suggesting that associated cytoplasmic Daxx has the role of an anti-apoptotic molecule.

Other functions 

The omnipresence of Daxx in the cell nucleus suggests that the protein may also function as a transcription factor. Although it contains no known DNA-binding domains, Daxx can interact and suppress several transcription factors, such as p53, p73, and NF-κB.  Proteins other than transcription factors are also blocked or inhibited by Daxx, such as the TGF-β pathway regulator, Smad4, conferring upon Daxx a major role in TGF-β signaling.

References

Further reading

External links 
 
 PDBe-KB provides an overview of all the structure information available in the PDB for Human Death domain-associated protein 6